Cazenovia is an incorporated town in Madison County, New York. The population was 6,740 at the time of the 2020 census. The town is named after Theophile Cazenove, the Agent General of the Holland Land Company.

The Town of Cazenovia has a village also named Cazenovia. The town is on the county's western border.

The village of Cazenovia is home to Cazenovia College, a small liberal arts college in the greater Syracuse area. It was founded in 1824, known then as the Genesee Seminary.

History 
 
The Town of Cazenovia was established in 1793 from the Towns of Whitestown and Paris (both in Oneida County) before the creation of Madison County. Subsequently, other towns in the county were formed from partitions of its territory. Cazenovia was part of a region called "The Gore", based on a surveying error.

It was founded by John Lincklaen, an agent of the Holland Land Company, and was named after Theophile Cazenove, Lincklaen's supervisor.

Geography
According to the United States Census Bureau, the town has a total area of 51.7 square miles (134.0 km2), with 49.9 square miles (129.2 km2) of land and 1.8 square miles (4.7 km2) of (3.54%) water. The town contains Cazenovia Lake.

The western town line is the border of Onondaga County.

U.S. Route 20, also known as Albany Street in the Village of Cazenovia, crosses the town.

Demographics

As of the census of 2000, there were 6,481 people, 2,353 households, and 1,658 families residing in the town. The population density was 129.9 people per square mile (50.2/km2). There were 2,567 housing units at an average density of 51.5 per square mile (19.9/km2). The racial makeup of the town was 97.25% White, 1.10% Black or African American, 0.26% Native American, 0.52% Asian, 0.15% from other races, and 0.69% from two or more races. Hispanic or Latino of any race were 1.48% of the population.

There were 2,353 households, out of which 32.3% had children under the age of 18 living with them, 61.0% were married couples living together, 6.8% had a female householder with no husband present, and 29.5% were non-families. 24.5% of all households were made up of individuals, and 12.3% had someone living alone who was 65 years of age or older. The average household size was 2.51 and the average family size was 3.02.

In the town, the population was spread out, with 24.0% under the age of 18, 12.8% from 18 to 24, 23.5% from 25 to 44, 25.2% from 45 to 64, and 14.5% who were 65 years of age or older. The median age was 39 years. For every 100 females, there were 88.7 males. For every 100 females age 18 and over, there were 83.1 males.

The median income for a household in the town was $57,232, and the median income for a family was $73,590. Males had a median income of $50,556 versus $31,613 for females. The per capita income for the town was $28,957. About 2.4% of families and 4.3% of the population were below the poverty line, including 1.9% of those under age 18 and 6.7% of those age 65 or over.

Communities and locations in the Town of Cazenovia

Abell Corners – A location east of Ballina.
Ballina – A location south of the village of Cazenovia.
Cazenovia – A village located on US-20 by Cazenovia Lake.
Cazenovia Lake – A lake located by the village of Cazenovia.
Chittenango Falls – A location on the eastern town border, located north of Cazenovia.
Delphi Falls – A hamlet located west-southwest of Union.
Delphi Falls – A waterfall located west-southwest of Union.
Delphi Station – A location north of the hamlet of New Woodstock.
Juddville – A location south of Abell Corners.
New Woodstock – A hamlet located south of the village of Cazenovia.
North Cazenovia – A location north of the village of Cazenovia.
Perkins Corner – A location southwest of Rippleton on NY-13.
Rippleton – A hamlet located southwest of the village of Cazenovia, known as "Pig City" in the 1800s.
Union – A location west of Delphi Station.
West Woodstock – A location west of New Woodstock.

National Register of Historic Places
The following sites and historic districts are listed on the National Register of Historic Places.

|}

Notable people
Edward P. Allis (1824–1889), businessman and unsuccessful candidate for governor of Wisconsin
Edward Griffin Beckwith (1818–1881), soldier and explorer
Anne Burrell (born 1969), chef and TV personality
Samuel Northrup Castle (1808–1894), missionary in Hawaii; founder of Castle & Cooke
Sarah Brown Ingersoll Cooper, philanthropist and educator
John W. Dwinelle (1816–1888), lawyer and politician in California
Harrison Stiles Fairchild (1820–1901), brigadier general in the Union Army
Siobhan Fallon (born May 13, 1961), actress
Melanie Joy (1993-) Army 1LT, OIR Veteran, Meritorious Service Medal recipient
Beezie Madden (born November 20, 1963), Olympic equestrian gold medalist
Lauren McLean, 56th mayor of Boise, Idaho (raised in Cazenovia)
Charles Stebbins (1789–1873), Acting lieutenant governor of New York in 1829
Steve Suhey (1922–1977), football player at Penn State and in the NFL
Ezra Greenleaf Weld (1801–1874), photographer and abolitionist

Economy
 Marquardt Group has one of its headquarters in Cazenovia.

See also 
 Cazenovia Village Historic District
 Chittenango Falls State Park

Gallery

References

External links

 Town of Cazenovia, NY
 Village of Cazenovia, NY
 Cazenovia NY Central Schools
 Cazenovia NY Chamber of Commerce
 Cazenovia College
  Early history of Cazenovia

 
Syracuse metropolitan area
1793 establishments in New York (state)
Towns in Madison County, New York